Edward Ayshford Sanford, FRS (23 May 1794 – 1 December 1871) was a British Member of Parliament.

He was the only son of William Ayshford Sanford of Nynehead and Lynton, Devon and educated at Eton College (1808–13) and Brasenose College, Oxford. He lived at Nynehead Court, Wellington, Somerset.

Sanford was elected Member of Parliament for Somerset in 1830, sitting until 1832, and then represented Somerset West from 1832 to 1841. He was a Justice of the Peace (JP) and Deputy Lieutenant for Somerset, serving as High Sheriff of Somerset for 1848–49.

In 1832 he was elected a Fellow of the Royal Society.

He died in 1871, leaving his estates to his eldest son, William Ayshford Sanford. He had married twice: firstly Henrietta, the daughter of Sir William Langham, 8th Baronet, of Cottesbrooke, Northamptonshire, with whom he had 5 sons (2 of whom predeceased him) and 2 daughters and secondly Lady Caroline Anna Stanhope, the daughter of Charles Stanhope, 3rd Earl of Harrington. His son William was Colonial Secretary of Western Australia (1852–55).

References

 

.

1794 births
1871 deaths
People educated at Eton College
Alumni of Brasenose College, Oxford
Fellows of the Royal Society
Deputy Lieutenants of Somerset
High Sheriffs of Somerset
Members of the Parliament of the United Kingdom for English constituencies
UK MPs 1830–1831
UK MPs 1831–1832
UK MPs 1832–1835
UK MPs 1835–1837
UK MPs 1837–1841